Albizia chinensis is a species of legume in the genus Albizia, native to south and Southeast asia, from India to China and Indonesia.

The genus is named after the Italian nobleman Filippo degli Albizzi, belonging to the famous Florentine family Albizzi, who introduced it to Europe in the mid-18th century, and it is sometimes incorrectly spelled Albizzia.

Description
Albizia chinensis is a deciduous or evergreen tree that reaches a height of up to 30–43 m. Its trunk has a diameter up to 1–2 m. Its flowers are stalked heads that aggregate into a yellow panicle. The fruits are indehiscent pods.

Uses
Albizia chinensis is a browse tree, its leaves being readily eaten by goats. It is also a shade tree in plantations. It can be planted as an ornamental tree.

References

External links
http://www.worldagroforestry.org/sea/products/afdbases/af/asp/SpeciesInfo.asp?SpID=1787#Identity 
http://plants.usda.gov/java/profile?symbol=ALCH2
http://www.flowersofindia.net/catalog/slides/Chinese%20Albizia.html

chinensis
Fodder